John McHugh (fl. 1898–1945) was an Irish nationalist politician.

McHugh worked as a farmer.  In 1898, he was elected to Fermanagh County Council, serving until 1922.  By the end of this period, he was the Chairman of the council.  He was elected for the Nationalist Party in Fermanagh and Tyrone at the 1925 Northern Ireland general election, taking his seat in November 1927, but standing down at the 1929 general election.  That same year, he was elected to the Senate of Northern Ireland and served until 1945.

References

Year of birth missing
Year of death missing
Farmers from Northern Ireland
Members of the House of Commons of Northern Ireland 1925–1929
Members of the Senate of Northern Ireland 1929–1933
Members of the Senate of Northern Ireland 1933–1937
Members of the Senate of Northern Ireland 1937–1941
Members of the Senate of Northern Ireland 1941–1945
Nationalist Party (Ireland) members of the House of Commons of Northern Ireland
Nationalist Party (Ireland) members of the Senate of Northern Ireland
Members of the House of Commons of Northern Ireland for Fermanagh and Tyrone
Members of Fermanagh County Council